Statistics of DPR Korea Football League in the 2009 season.

Overview
P'yŏngyang City won the championship. Chadongch'a and Wŏlmido were relegated to the 2nd level.

Clubs
The football clubs in the season were as follows:

April 25 (Namp'o)
Amrokkang (P'yŏngyang)
Ch'ilbosan
Chadongch'a (Ch'ŏngjin)
Kigwanch'a (Sinŭiju)
P'yŏngyang City (P'yŏngyang)
Rimyŏngsu (Sariwŏn)
Sobaeksu (P'yŏngyang)
Wŏlmido (Kimch'aek)

Cup competitions
April 25 won the seventh edition of the Man'gyŏngdae Prize, whilst second division side Kyŏnggong'ŏp defeated Amrokkang 1-0 to win the Republican Championship.

References

DPR Korea Football League seasons
1
Korea
Korea